The England cricket team toured Australia in the 1978–79 season to play a six-match Test series against Australia for The Ashes. England won the series 5-1, thereby retaining The Ashes.  

This series was often over shadowed by Kerry Packer's World Series Cricket which meant many players from both sides were absent, including Greg Chappell. Australia were more handicapped which opened the way for England and their captain Mike Brearley. The side was managed by Doug Insole, Ken Barrington assistant-manager/coach and physiotherapist Bernard Thomas was given credit as the prime reason for England's supreme fitness.

Test series summary
Note: Each over consists of 8 balls.

First Test

Second Test

Third Test

Fourth Test

Fifth Test

Sixth Test

One Day Internationals (ODIs)

The ODI series was contested over five games, with innings of maximum 40 eight-ball overs. Australia won the series 2-1, with one match abandoned and one no result.

1st ODI

2nd ODI

Only 40 minutes of play were possible before rain caused the match to be called off. During the brief action, Chris Old dismissed Graeme Wood caught behind for six.

3rd ODI

Australia chose to bat first on a pitch of variable bounce, but from a position of 52 for two then collapsed to be all out for 101, with Man of the Match Mike Hendrick claiming 4/25 and Ian Botham 3/16. England reached the required target for the loss of only three wickets and with more than ten overs to spare; Mike Brearley fell early, bowled for a duck by Rodney Hogg, but Geoff Boycott anchored the innings with a patient 39 not out off 107 balls.

4th ODI

5th ODI

Annual reviews
 Playfair Cricket Annual 1979
 Wisden Cricketers' Almanack 1980

References

Further reading
 Chris Harte, A History of Australian Cricket, Andre Deutsch, 1993

External links 
 
 
 CricketArchive tour itinerary 

1978 in Australian cricket
1978 in English cricket
1978–79 Australian cricket season
1979 in Australian cricket
1979 in English cricket
1978-79
International cricket competitions from 1975–76 to 1980
1978-79